The Perjury Act 1911 (1 & 2 Geo 5 c 6) is an Act of the Parliament of the United Kingdom. It creates the offence of perjury and a number of similar offences.

This Act has effect as if section 89 of the Criminal Justice Act 1967 and section 80 of the Civil Partnership Act 2004 were contained in this Act.

Section 1 - Perjury
This section creates the offence of perjury.

Section 1A - False unsworn statement under Evidence (Proceedings in other Jurisdictions) Act 1975
This section was inserted by section 8(1) of, and Schedule 1 to, the Evidence (Proceedings in other Jurisdictions) Act 1975. It provides:

This offence is triable either way. A person guilty of this offence is liable, on conviction on indictment, to imprisonment for a term not exceeding two years, or to a fine, or to both, or, summary conviction, to imprisonment for a term not exceeding six months, or to a fine not exceeding the prescribed sum, or to both.

Section 7 - Aiders, abettors, suborners, etc
Section 7(1) is redundant.

Section 9 - Power to direct a prosecution for perjury
This section was repealed for England and Wales on 1 April 1986.

Section 10 - Jurisdiction of quarter sessions
This section was repealed by section 10(2) of, and Part II of Schedule 3 to, the Criminal Law Act 1967.

Section 11 - Application of Vexatious Indictments Act 1859
This section was repealed by section 10 of, and Schedule 3 to, the Administration of Justice (Miscellaneous Provisions) Act 1933.

Section 13 - Corroboration
This section provides:

The following cases are relevant to the interpretation of this section:
R v Mayhew (1834) 6 C & P 315
R v Threlfall, 10 Cr App R 112, 23 Cox 230
R v O'Connor [1980] Crim LR 43, CA
R v Rider, 83 Cr App R 207, [1986] Crim LR 626, CA
R v Stokes [1988] Crim LR 110, CA
R v Peach [1990] 1 WLR 976, [1990] 2 All ER 966, 91 Cr App R 379, [1990] Crim LR 741, CA
R v Carroll, 99 Cr App R 381, CA

Section 17 - Repeals
This section was repealed by the Statute Law Revision Act 1927.

Section 18 - Extent
This section reads:

The reference to Ireland must now be construed as a reference to Northern Ireland.

Section 19 - Short title and commencement
So much of this section as related commencement was repealed by the Statute Law Revision Act 1927.

Schedule
The Schedule was repealed by the Statute Law Revision Act 1927.

References
Halsbury's Statutes. Third Edition. Volume 8. Page 240 et seq.
Hansard

External links

The Perjury Act 1911, as amended from the National Archives.
The Perjury Act 1911, as originally enacted from the National Archives.

United Kingdom Acts of Parliament 1911
Perjury